The Tender Trap was a 1954 Broadway play by  Max Shulman and Robert Paul Smith starring Robert Preston, Ronny Graham, Kim Hunter and Joey Faye. It made its debut at the Longacre Theatre on October 13, 1954 and closed on January 8, 1955 after 102 performances.

The play was filmed in 1955 in a movie adaptation starring Frank Sinatra.

External links
Internet Broadway Database, The Tender Trap

1954 plays
Broadway plays
American plays adapted into films